John Simmons (born in Fort Belvoir, Virginia) is an American actor, comedian, founder Gross National Product Comedy and Washington, D.C.'s Scandal Tours.

Gross National Product Comedy is a comedy production company whose troupes have appeared on TV and radio, in their own PBS comedy specials and stage shows in New York and Los Angeles, and have been called Washington D.C.'s "comic monument" and "the capital's resident satirical gang".

John Simmons, son of a National Security Agency (NSA) employee, supposedly grew up amid the spy community in Washington, D.C. during the Cold War. It was life as normal, as far as he knew, to live at remote electronic listening posts, to "pop in and out of Washington every once in a while," to attend a different school and make new friends every two years. That didn't bother him at all. "It was fun, and it helped me prepare for this wacky life style."
 
He attended the University of North Carolina and then spent a year abroad at the University of Kent in Canterbury. He studied theatre and history ("not theatre history", he emphasizes), then ended up dropping the theatre and graduating in history and journalism. "I like history more than anything. I think that may be why I make fun of the news. The kind of stupidity that's going on now has just been repeated through the centuries; it's nothing new."

The idea of becoming involved in comedy goes bock to Simmons' very early years; he never really wanted to do anything else. "I wanted to have a comedy group, but it didn't seem right. It didn't seem like it was attainable, for some reason. There's no career path for comedy, is there? You don't go to Slapstick University. Comedy was a real fringe area when I was growing up; stand-up comedy wasn't especially popular then. And improv comedy today is still considered a stepchild to stand-up."
 
In 1980, following the year abroad, he got a job as a reporter for CCH (Commerce Clearing House), a "really boring" law publications company, and formed Gross National Product (under another name) for excitement and fun. "I lived this kind of Clark Kent existence. But it was a really great cover. I could go in, look at the Wire service, and if nothing was going on I'd just go home and go to bed. It did give me access to press conferences at the White House and lots of government agencies, but to translate what really goes on at that bureaucratic level is impossible. It's so inside the Beltway that you can't really make fun of it, so you go after what's in the news." 
GNP was one of the first comedy groups in Washington DC. "There was no venue for comedy then; we played in rock clubs." They did a lot of revues, performed in all the clubs in DC and Baltimore, MD, and developed a loyal following. In 1982, while continuing in DC, they started performing in clubs all over New York City. Then Simmons put GNP on hiatus for a two-year interval, 1984–86, when he came to Los Angeles to "check it out". His stay in Los Angeles included engagements at the Cast Theatre, The Comedy Store, and as understudy to John Roarke in the Odyssey Theatre's RAP MASTER RONNIE. The satirical and political theme of his comedy continued regardless of location. Upon returning to Washington, D.C., he revived GNP with a new cast and their popularity resumed. The original 80-seat space eventually proved to be too small, and in 1988 they moved to a larger 300-seat venue at The Bayou, the largest night club in Washington DC. Also in 1988, GNP inaugurated their Scandal Tours, an irreverent bus tour of the notorious scandal spots in DC.

What might explain the transition from a patriotic, NSA-oriented young boy to someone who looks at the political and social world with such a cynical eye? "Washingtonians are pretty cynical people: it's the political people and the people who work for them who are usually serious. I'm the product of a very cynical age. When I was in high school, the Watergate scandal was happening. The people that I associated with were the sons and daughters of reporters and that ilk, so we had a good time during Watergate. When you live in Washington and see this parade of "out-of-towners" every four years, you make fun of them. Some of them are real dorks, many of them are there because of political-favor appointments, and they always roll in with this sense of greatness. People in Washington are up on what's happening and they want to make fun. So we started to make fun of Congress and the Executive Branch."

Just as Simmons grew up with Watergate, GNP grew up with President Ronald Reagan, their favorite target for several years. "But we make fun of liberals, too. It depends on who's in power." The ability to adapt to a constantly changing world keeps GNP's revues up to the minute in content. For example: "The LA situation cannot be ignored. Right now, right here, the entire focus of a political debate has shifted. We're in the center at what's going on. It's a tragedy, just like the Contra thing, but somehow it's government with their pants down, and they look foolish."

GNP alumni 
Over the years, GNP has involved the talents of Robin Abb, Kevin Brown, Ron Butler, Doug Cox, Larry Coven, Sarah Delea, Brad Dismukes, Liz Demery, John Dryden, Shari Elliker,  Dion Flynn, Elliott Forrestt, Bob Garman, Tim Gore, Robert W. Heck, Ed Henley, Wes Johnson, Scott Keck, Richard "Scrumbly" Koldewyn, Chuck Kovacic, Bill Largess, John Moody, John Hardison, Emlyn Morinelli McFarland, Terri Madden, Tim Mollen, Bill Oakley, Nick Olcott, Joel Perry, Christopher Pray, Tim Rankin, Melissa Rauch, John Roarke, Kara Russel, Stephen Schmidt, Ken Star, Victor Steele, Vanessa Stout, Christine Thompson, Bruce Tobin, Erica Van Wagener, Josh Weinstein, Pam Woodruff, Wendy Yondorf.

References

External links
Gross National Product Comedy
The Unofficial Guide to Washington, D.C. By Eve Zibart
Washington Post - Comedy Tonight
LA Times - On the trail of the Scandals
Washington Post - The Political Arena
Sun Sentinel - Capital's Sleazy Side Keeps Bus Tour Rolling
San Diego Community News - Son of a Bush
Washington Post - Campaignfully Funny
SFGate - Making Headlines Hilarious - D.C. troupe satirizes sex scandal and more
"Sex, Lies" show zips along using top-notch improv
AEI Speakers Bureau
GNP Comedy Club en Francais
Women's Wear Daily - Susan Watters Reviews GNP
COMING HOME TO ROAST from The Washington Post
Bush Mimic 'Marries' Couple at Jefferson Memorial
Fodor's 2012 Washington, D.C. - Google Books
 MINI REVIEWS  from The Washington Post

Living people
1955 births
Male actors from Virginia
University of North Carolina at Chapel Hill alumni
Alumni of the University of Kent